Sarah Louise Rung (born 8 October 1989 in Stavanger) is a Paralympic swimmer of Norway. She became a wheelchair user after a back surgery in 2008. She won two gold medals and two silver medals at the 2012 Summer Paralympics in London. She also has several medals from both World- and European Championships. 2012 Summer Paralympics.

References

External links 
 
 
 

1989 births
Living people
Paralympic swimmers of Norway
Norwegian female backstroke swimmers
Norwegian female breaststroke swimmers
Norwegian female butterfly swimmers
Norwegian female freestyle swimmers
Norwegian female medley swimmers
Sportspeople from Stavanger
S5-classified Paralympic swimmers
Swimmers at the 2012 Summer Paralympics
Swimmers at the 2016 Summer Paralympics
Medalists at the 2012 Summer Paralympics
Medalists at the 2016 Summer Paralympics
Paralympic gold medalists for Norway
Paralympic silver medalists for Norway
Paralympic bronze medalists for Norway
Medalists at the World Para Swimming Championships
Medalists at the World Para Swimming European Championships
Paralympic medalists in swimming
21st-century Norwegian women